Cerithiella producta is a species of very small sea snail, a marine gastropod mollusk in the family Newtoniellidae. It was described by Dall, in 1927.

Description 
The maximum recorded shell length is 8.5 mm.

Habitat 
Minimum recorded depth is 538 m. Maximum recorded depth is 538 m.

References

Newtoniellidae
Gastropods described in 1927